The 1939–40 Estonian Football Championship was the 19th official top-division football league season in Estonia, organized by the Estonian Football Association. It was the last season before World War II. PK Olümpia Tartu won the title.

League table

Results

Top scorers

References

Estonian Football Championship
1939 in Estonian football
1940 in Estonian football
Estonia